The Donald Dewar Memorial Debating Tournament is a national debating competition held throughout the year in Scottish Secondary Schools. It is one of the leading debating tournaments in Scotland and is organised annually by the Law Society of Scotland. It was created in 1999 and was held in order to remember the life, work and passion of Donald Dewar, the first First Minister of Scotland. Since 2006, the final of the tournament has been held in the debating chamber of The Scottish Parliament, in Edinburgh. The 2016 competition had 128 teams participating, with winners Finlay Allmond and Caitlin Sherret from Nairn Academy. Craigmount High School have won the competition a record three times- in 2007 2012, and 2014. Glasgow Academy, Peebles High School, and Robert Gordon's College are the only other schools to have won the competition more than once.

Format of The Competition

The competition has four stages of debate. These take place throughout Scottish Secondary Schools from November to June, with the final being held in the Scottish Parliament.

Winners

References

1999 establishments in Scotland
British debating competitions
1999 competitions
Competitions in Scotland